Laurence Tomashoff (born ), known professionally as Larry Thomas, is an American actor, best known for his guest role as Yev Kassem/the Soup Nazi on Seinfeld, for which he was nominated for an Emmy Award. In addition to making personal appearances as the Soup Nazi, Thomas has appeared in a number of films, TV shows, and commercials, and appears at autograph-signing shows across the country.

Early life
Thomas was born in the New York City borough of Brooklyn to a Jewish family of Russian and Romanian background. He moved to California at the age of 11, where he was raised by his mother.

Career

Acting
Prior to acting, Thomas had jobs as a bail bondsman, bartender, and janitor.

He is best known for his role as Yev Kassem in the "Soup Nazi" episode of the television sitcom Seinfeld. According to an interview, Thomas, who was a huge fan of the series, attended his audition in character in a military uniform, and won the role by improvising his now-famous line, "No soup for you!" His widely acclaimed performance earned him a nomination for the Primetime Emmy Award for Outstanding Guest Actor in a Comedy Series in 1996, which he lost to Tim Conway for Coach. He reprised the role in the series' final episode.

In 1997, he made a cameo appearance as the blackjack dealer in Austin Powers: International Man of Mystery, sharing the scene with Mike Myers and Robert Wagner. In 2004, he guest-starred as himself in the Scrubs episode "My Self-Examination", where the main character tried to trick him into saying the Soup Nazi's catchphrase, "No Soup for You!" He also played a Soup Nazi-like "food cop" in a commercial for the Center for Consumer Freedom. That same year he guest-starred in the television series Drake & Josh as Bob Galloway in the episode "2 Idiots and a Baby."

In 2006, Thomas made an appearance in Scott Grenke's independent comedy feature Spaced Out (which includes a variation of the catchphrase). This was the start of a working relationship with Boomstick Films which includes co-starring roles in Not Another B Movie, Dr. Spine, and the award-winning Paranormal Activity spoof Paranormal Calamity.

In other later roles of note, Larry has portrayed each of the two most iconic Middle Eastern villains of American history. In 2006, he guest-starred in Arrested Development as a Saddam Hussein lookalike. An earlier joke had one character having a photo taken with the real Saddam, after mistaking him for Thomas. Thomas also played the role of Osama bin Laden in Uwe Boll's 2008 shock comedy film Postal.

In 2009, Thomas appeared in the independent feature Untitled Horror Comedy playing the role of "Dwayne."

In February 2012, Thomas again appeared as the Soup Nazi in an Acura NSX commercial featuring comedians Jerry Seinfeld and Jay Leno.

In February 2013, he began filming for Tesla Effect: A Tex Murphy Adventure, a video game using live-action cut-scenes.

In 2016, he appeared in a short comedy film The Love Suckers, playing a marriage therapist giving bad advice to a couple along with Eddie Deezen and Caryn Richman.

His latest project is Dads!, a television sitcom pilot that is written, directed, and produced by Thomas and David Everhart Castro. It is currently in post-production.

Public appearances as the Soup Nazi
In 2006, Thomas began selling autographed photographs of himself through catalogs such as Wall Street Creations Inc., glaring at the camera in chef's garb, with the handwritten notation "No soup for you!"

In 2011, Thomas appeared dressed as the Soup Nazi at a New York Mets game. He gave DVDs to fans who correctly answered trivia questions.

In 2012, he again appeared as the Soup Nazi while touring the United States with a Seinfeld food truck, allowing fans to pose with him and signing autographs.

On July 5, 2014, he appeared at Brooklyn Cyclones as the Soup Nazi to celebrate Salute to Seinfeld Night, and threw out the first pitch.

In 2015, he reprised his role as the Soup Nazi when Hulu opened "Seinfeld: The Apartment" in New York City, creating a real-world version of Jerry Seinfeld's Upper West Side apartment, complete with a show memorabilia gallery and interactive Seinfeld fan experience to mark the streaming debut of all episodes of the series on Hulu.

In September 2018, Thomas appeared as the Soup Nazi for a surprise guest appearance at a wedding in Old Tappan, New Jersey. He announced the couple for the first time as husband and wife, and later took photos with their guests. Several photos from the wedding can be seen using the hashtag #soupnaziwedding on Instagram.

Music
Larry has written and recorded songs: "Nico's Song (With Out You)" written for Dads!, "It's Angela (The Wife I Choose)", "Running, Running, Running (Ben's Song), and "Ma! (Ode to Dorine)".

Gun control advocacy
In 2013, Serbu Firearms refused to sell their model BFG-50A semi-automatic .50 rifles to the New York City Police Department after the passage of the NY SAFE Act that classified their weapon as an assault rifle. Refusal to sell to states that have outlawed the sale of firearms to the public under the heading of assault rifles has become more common. Following their refusal to sell the rifles, Serbu then had T-shirts printed with an image of the classic Seinfeld character The Soup Nazi, played by actor Thomas, and the words "No Serbu For You". Thomas, a gun control advocate, contacted Facebook and the shirt printers to have the shirts removed. Serbu has since removed the image of Thomas and replaced it with one of their founder Mark Serbu.

Filmography

Film

Television

Video games

References

External links

Larry Thomas on YouTube

Living people
American gun control activists
American male film actors
American male television actors
American people of Romanian-Jewish descent
American people of Russian-Jewish descent
Jewish American male actors
People from Brooklyn
Male actors from New York City
Activists from New York (state)
21st-century American Jews
Year of birth missing (living people)